The 2011–12 Football League Two (referred to as the Npower Football League Two for sponsorship reasons) is the eighth season of the league under its current title and nineteenth season under its current league division format.

Changes from last season

Team changes

From League Two
Promoted to League One
 Chesterfield
 Bury
 Wycombe Wanderers
 Stevenage

Relegated to Conference National
 Stockport County
 Lincoln City

To League Two
Relegated from League One
 Dagenham & Redbridge
 Bristol Rovers
 Plymouth Argyle
 Swindon Town F.C.

Promoted from Conference National
 Crawley Town
 AFC Wimbledon

Team overview

Stadia and locations

Personnel and sponsoring

Managerial changes

League table
A total of 24 teams contest the division: 18 sides remaining in the division from last season, four relegated from League One, and two promoted from Conference National.

Play-offs

Results
The fixtures for the League Two were released on 17 June 2011. The season started on 6 August 2011, and is scheduled to conclude on 5 May 2012.

Statistics

Top goalscorers

Top assists

Monthly awards

References

 
EFL League Two seasons
3
4
Eng